Worms are many different distantly related bilateral animals that typically have a long cylindrical tube-like body, no limbs, and no eyes (though not always). 

Various types of worm occupy a small variety of parasitic niches, living inside the bodies of other animals. Free-living worm species do not live on land but instead live in marine or freshwater environments or underground by burrowing.

In biology, "worm" refers to an obsolete taxon, vermes, used by Carolus Linnaeus and Jean-Baptiste Lamarck for all non-arthropod invertebrate animals, now seen to be paraphyletic. The name stems from the Old English word wyrm. Most animals called "worms" are invertebrates, but the term is also used for the amphibian caecilians and the slowworm Anguis, a legless burrowing lizard. Invertebrate animals commonly called "worms" include annelids (earthworms and marine polychaete or bristle worms), nematodes (roundworms), platyhelminthes (flatworms), marine nemertean worms ("bootlace worms"), marine Chaetognatha (arrow worms), priapulid worms, and insect larvae such as grubs and maggots.

Worms may also be called helminths—particularly in medical terminology—when referring to parasitic worms, especially the Nematoda (roundworms) and Cestoda (tapeworms) which reside in the intestines of their host. When an animal or human is said to "have worms", it means that it is infested with parasitic worms, typically roundworms or tapeworms. Lungworm is also a common parasitic worm found in various animal species such as fish and cats.

History 

In taxonomy, "worm" refers to an obsolete grouping, Vermes, used by Carl Linnaeus and Jean-Baptiste Lamarck for all non-arthropod invertebrate animals, now seen to be polyphyletic. In 1758, Linnaeus created the first hierarchical classification in his Systema Naturae. In his original scheme, the animals were one of three kingdoms, divided into the classes of Vermes, Insecta, Pisces, Amphibia, Aves, and Mammalia. Since then the last four have all been subsumed into a single phylum, the Chordata, while his Insecta (which included the crustaceans and arachnids) and Vermes have been renamed or broken up. The process was begun in 1793 by Lamarck, who called the Vermes une espèce de chaos (a sort of chaos) and split the group into three new phyla, worms, echinoderms, and polyps (which contained corals and jellyfish). By 1809, in his Philosophie Zoologique, Lamarck had created 9 phyla apart from vertebrates (where he still had 4 phyla: mammals, birds, reptiles, and fish) and molluscs, namely cirripedes, annelids, crustaceans, arachnids, insects, worms, radiates, polyps, and infusorians. Chordates are remarkably wormlike by ancestry.

Informal grouping 
In the 13th century, worms were recognized in Europe as part of the category of reptiles that consisted of a miscellany of egg-laying creatures, including "snakes, various fantastic monsters, lizards, assorted amphibians," as recorded by Vincent of Beauvais in his Mirror of Nature. In everyday language, the term worm is also applied to various other living forms such as larvae, insects, millipedes, centipedes, shipworms (teredo worms), or even some vertebrates (creatures with a backbone) such as blindworms and caecilians. Worms include several groups.

 The first group Platyhelminthes includes the flatworms, tapeworms, and flukes. They have a flat, ribbon- or leaf-shaped body with a pair of eyes at the front. Some are parasites.
 The second group contains the threadworms, roundworms, and hookworms. This phylum is called Nematoda. Threadworms may be microscopic, such as the vinegar eelworm, or more than 1-metre (3 feet) long. They are found in damp earth, moss, decaying substances, fresh water, or salt water. Some roundworms are also parasites: the Guinea worm, for example, gets under the skin of the feet and legs of people living in tropical countries.
 The third group consists of the segmented worms, with bodies divided into segments or rings. This phylum is called Annelida. Among these worms are the earthworms and the bristle worms of the sea.

Familiar worms include the earthworms, members of phylum Annelida. Other invertebrate groups may be called worms, especially colloquially. In particular, many unrelated insect larvae are called "worms", such as the railroad worm, woodworm, glowworm, bloodworm, butterworm, inchworm, mealworm, silkworm, and woolly bear worm.

Worms may also be called helminths, particularly in medical terminology when referring to parasitic worms, especially the Nematoda (roundworms) and Cestoda (tapeworms). Hence, "helminthology" is the study of parasitic worms. When a human or an animal, such as a dog or horse, is said to "have worms", it means that it is infested with parasitic worms, typically roundworms or tapeworms. Deworming is a method to kill off the worms that have infected a human or animal by giving anthelmintic drugs.

"Ringworm" is not a worm at all, but a skin fungus.

Lobopodians are an informal grouping of extinct panarthropods from the Cambrian to the Carboniferous that are often called worms or "worm like animals" despite the fact they had legs in the form of stubby lobopods. Likewise, the extant Onychophora are sometimes called velvet worms despite possessing stubby legs.

Society and culture 

Wyrm was the Old English  term for carnivorous reptiles ("serpents") and mythical dragons. "Worm" has also been used as a pejorative epithet to describe a cowardly, weak or pitiable person. 

Worms can also be farmed for the production of nutrient-rich vermicompost.

See also 
 Sea worm, lists various types of marine worms
 Worm cast
 Worm charming

Notes

References

 
Obsolete animal taxa

cy:Abwydyn